Yankee Fakir is a 1947 American mystery film directed and produced by W. Lee Wilder and written by Richard S. Conway. The film stars Douglas Fowley, Joan Woodbury, Clem Bevans, Ransom M. Sherman, Frank Reicher and Marc Lawrence. The film was released on April 1, 1947, by Republic Pictures.

Plot
Two peddlers Mergatroid Barthlomew "Yankee" Davis (Douglas Fowley) and Professor Newton (Ransom M. Sherman) discover a smuggling operation in the fictional town of Mystic, Arizona.  Border patrol officer Mason (Forrest Taylor) investigates, while his daughter Mary Mason (Joan Woodbury) runs a boarding house.

Cast   
Douglas Fowley as Murgatroyd Bartholomew 'Yankee' Davis
Joan Woodbury as Mary Mason
Clem Bevans as Shaggy Hartley posing as Professor Davis
Ransom M. Sherman as Professor Newton 
Frank Reicher as Banker H.W. Randall
Marc Lawrence as Duke
Walter Soderling as Sheriff
Eula Guy as Mrs. Irmatrude Tetley
Forrest Taylor as Border Guard Mason
Elinor Appleton as Jenny
Peter Michael as Border Guard Walker
Elspeth Dudgeon as Scrubwoman
Ernie Adams as Charlie
Tom Bernard as Tommy Mason

References

External links
 

1947 films
1940s English-language films
American mystery films
1947 mystery films
Republic Pictures films
Films directed by W. Lee Wilder
American black-and-white films
1940s American films